General Welsh may refer to:

James Welsh (East India Company officer) (1775–1861), Madras Army general
Mark Welsh (born 1953), U.S. Air Force four-star general
Thomas Welsh (general) (1824–1863), Union Army brigadier general

See also
General Welch (disambiguation)